Vistamar School is a private, co-educational college-preparatory high school in El Segundo in Los Angeles County, California, United States.

Vistamar School opened in September 2005, following almost four years of research, planning, fund raising and personnel recruitment. The school has a  building at 737 Hawaii Street in El Segundo and has remodeled approximately three quarters of the space for student use. Enrollment in 2012-13 was about 270 students. Current enrollment is 280 students. Over the next few years, Vistamar plans to expand to an anticipated enrollment of 300 students in grades 9 through 12.

Courses 
Vistamar offers a wide array of courses to the student body.

Mathematics
 Math 1 - A combination of algebra and geometry.
 Math 2 - A combination of geometry and some 3d trigonometry.
 Math 3 - A combination of algebra and trigonometry, often equated to algebra 2.
 Math 3 Honors - Same as math 3, but at an accelerated pace.
 Math 4 - Often equated to pre-calculus.
 Math 4 Honors - Same as math 4, but at an accelerated pace.
AP Statistics
AP Calculus AB
AP Calculus BC
Advanced Topics in Math (ATM)
Honors Multivariable Calculus

Humanities
This is the study of English and History.

 Humanities 9 Project
 Humanities 9 Core
 Humanities 10 Project
 Humanities 10 Core
 AP Human Geography
 English 11 (American Literature)
 AP English Language & Composition
 English 12 (Advanced Topics In Literature)
 Advanced Writers Workshop
 AP English Literature
 United States History
 Honors United States History
 Psychology
 AP United States Government
 Applied Economics
 Honors Applied Economics

Sciences
Modular Science 1
Modular Science 2
Modular Science 3
Anatomy & Physiology
Inventions & Engineering
AP Physics 1
AP Physics C
AP Physics Electricity & Magnetism
AP Chemistry
AP Biology
AP Environmental Science

Technology
Introduction to computer science
AP Computer Science
 Introduction to Robotics
Introduction to Coding

Arts  
These are art electives

2-D art
Drawing
Painting
Mixed media
3-D art
Hand building
Sculpture
Wheel
Digital Media
Digital photography
Graphic design
Video production
Introduction to acting
Advanced Acting
Music
Theory
Composition
Performance
Advanced Placement music theory
Studio art - This course is offered to juniors who show interest in the arts, but choose not to enroll in the AP class. It is a studio course in preparation for AP studio art.
Advanced Placement Studio Art
Photography
Advanced Photography
Film Making
Advanced Film Making

Theatrical and Film Productions 
The following were directed by Chris Kent:

 Metamorphoses based on a poem by Ovid
Blithe Spirit by Noël Coward
Rumors by Neil Simon
One Flew Over The Cuckoo's Nest
The Laramie Project by Moisés Kaufman and members of the Tectonic Theater Project
Guys and Dolls by Frank Loesser

The following were directed by Kevin Shaw:
 Two Gentlemen of Verona by William Shakespeare
 Little Shop of Horrors by Alan Menken and Howard Ashman

The following were directed by Mickey Blaine:
 Moon Over Buffalo by Ken Ludwig
 1984 by George Orwell
 Urinetown by Mark Hollmann and Greg Kotis
Grease
Chicago
Rumors
Amateurs
Macbeth
Pippin (Spring 2018)
Mamma Mia (Spring 2019)
Dogfight (Fall 2019)
Romeo and Juliet (Winter 2020)
A Chorus Line (Spring 2020, postponed until further notice)
The Glass Menagerie (Fall 2020)

Student Led Films

Your Future (2018–Present)
Expected Release Date: Unknown
Summary: Set in the present day, the film featuring a student led cast and crew tackles issues such as gun violence while the characters navigate their ever-changing and complex high school lives.
Web Series - Unknown Title (2019–Present)
Expected Release Date: Unknown

References

External links
 Official website

Educational institutions established in 2005
High schools in Los Angeles County, California
Private high schools in California
2005 establishments in California